Paul Noone may refer to:

 Paul Noone (Gaelic footballer) (born 1980s), Swedish Gaelic footballer
 Paul Noone (rugby league) (born 1981), English rugby league footballer

See also
 Paul Noon OBE (born 1952), British trade unionist
 Paul Noonan (born 1974), Irish musician